Tibisia is a genus of flowering plants belonging to the family Poaceae.

Its native range is Caribbean to French Guiana.

Species:
 Tibisia angustifolia (Nash) C.D.Tyrrell, Londoño & L.G.Clark 
 Tibisia farcta (Aubl.) C.D.Tyrrell, Londoño & L.G.Clark 
 Tibisia pinifolia (Catasús) C.D.Tyrrell, Londoño & L.G.Clark

References

Poaceae
Poaceae genera